The district of Adur, one of seven local government districts in the English county of West Sussex, has 119 buildings with listed status.  The urbanised southern part of the district forms part of the Brighton/Worthing/Littlehampton conurbation, and most listed structures are in the three main centres of population: Southwick, Shoreham-by-Sea and Lancing.  The towns have grown residentially and industrially in the 20th century, but all three have ancient origins as villages and manors on the banks of the River Adur and the English Channel coast.  The rest of Adur district's territory is remote downland countryside with scattered farms and hamlets; some of their buildings also have listed status.

In England, a building or structure is defined as "listed" when it is placed on a statutory register of buildings of "special architectural or historic interest" by the Secretary of State for Culture, Media and Sport, a Government department, in accordance with the Planning (Listed Buildings and Conservation Areas) Act 1990 (a successor to the 1947 act). English Heritage, a non-departmental public body, acts as an agency of this department to administer the process and advise the department on relevant issues. There are three grades of listing status.  Grade I, the highest, is defined as being of "exceptional interest"; Grade II* is used for "particularly important buildings of more than special interest"; and Grade II, the lowest, is used for buildings of "special interest".

There are currently 7 grade I listed buildings, 7 grade II* listed buildings, and 105 grade II listed buildings in Adur district.

Key

Listed buildings

Delisted buildings
Buildings are sometimes removed from the statutory list.

References

Notes

Bibliography

Adur District
Listed buildings in West Sussex
Lists of listed buildings in West Sussex